Sail On Sailor – 1972 is an expanded reissue of the albums Carl and the Passions – "So Tough" (1972) and Holland (1973) by American rock band the Beach Boys. Produced by engineer Mark Linett and Brother Records archive manager Alan Boyd, it was released by Capitol/UME on December 2, 2022. The title is taken from the Holland track "Sail On, Sailor".

Background
In August 2021, Capitol/UME issued Feel Flows: The Sunflower & Surf's Up Sessions 1969–1971, which included versions of the "So Tough" tracks "Marcella" and "You Need a Mess of Help to Stand Alone". A follow-up to Feel Flows was first officially announced in a press release from April 2022 that discussed the Beach Boys' "60th anniversary celebration". The track listing, title, and release date for Sail On Sailor – 1972 was then revealed on September 27. The original release date was to be November 18.

Sail On Sailor – 1972 was issued in multiple configurations.  The six-disc Super Deluxe Edition box set contains 105 tracks, 80 of which were previously unreleased, including "Hard Time", "Carry Me Home", "Out in the Country", "Oh Sweet Something", "Spark in the Dark", "Rooftop Harry", "Body Talk (Grease Job)", "Pa Let Her Go Out (Better Get Back in Bed)", "Little Child (Daddy Dear)", and a medley of "Gimme Some Lovin'" and "I Need Your Love".

Critical reception

At Metacritic, which assigns a normalized rating out of 100 to reviews from critics, Sail On Sailor received an average score of 82 based on six reviews, indicating "universal acclaim". AllMusic contributor Tim Sendra called it "a fine archival release" and "fascinating listening."

Reviewing the set for American Songwriter, Hal Horowitz decreed, "This wasn’t a tremendously fertile period for the group. Yet based on the animated gig and some inspired moments, they still sounded vital, and capable of writing impressive new music, albeit inconsistently and largely without Brian’s input." John Robinson of Spin wrote that listeners would likely "have mixed feelings" about this period in the band's history, although "[m]uch of the music is still delightful".

Mark Smotroff of Analog Planet felt that the set had a better mastering job than that afforded to Feel Flows.

Track listing

6-CD super deluxe edition

5-LP super deluxe limited edition

2-LP editions

LP one
Carl and the Passions – "So Tough" – as above

LP two
Holland – as above

7" EP
Mount Vernon and Fairway – as above

2-CD edition

Charts

See also
 List of unreleased songs recorded by the Beach Boys

References

External links
 
 
 Beach Boys Look Back at Band’s Early-‘70s Shift Toward FM Rock in New ’Sail On Sailor’ Collection

The Beach Boys compilation albums
Capitol Records compilation albums
2022 compilation albums
Albums produced by Mark Linett
Reissue albums
Compilation albums published posthumously